Rocky Point Park was an amusement park on the Narragansett Bay shore of Warwick, Rhode Island. It operated from the late 1840s until it closed in 1995. In 1996, the park officially filed for bankruptcy.

History 
Rocky Point Park was first conceived by Captain William Winslow in the 1840s. By 1847, he had purchased a part of the land and began to offer amusements and serve dinner.

On Sunday, September 6, 1903, blue laws prevented the National League's Boston Beaneaters from playing the Philadelphia Phillies at their usual home park, South End Grounds in Boston. The game was moved to a field at Rocky Point, where the ocean apparently came right up to the edge of the outfield. (Boston won, 3–2.)

In July 1936, the salt-water swimming pool at the park hosted tryouts for the 1936 Summer Olympics.

From the 1950s through the mid-1990s, Rocky Point Park was one of the most popular attractions in Rhode Island. It also featured the Shore Dinner Hall, famous for its clamcakes, steamers, lobsters, and Rhode Island style clam chowder (thin red clam broth), which seated over 4,000 patrons at a time. In later years, Rocky Point's locally famous logo of a lobster tipping his hat was used in much of the park's advertising both in TV commercials and in print. The park's circa 1963 Castle of Terror dark ride (renamed House of Horrors in 1970) was one of its most popular rides and lives on in social media conversation decades after its demolition.

In addition to its amusement rides, Rocky Point also occasionally hosted concerts in its Palladium Ballroom. Musical artists who performed at the venue during its final 30 years of operation include: The Yardbirds (1967), Big Brother and the Holding Company with Janis Joplin (1968), Sly & The Family Stone (1969), REO Speedwagon, AC/DC and Thin Lizzy (1978), The Fixx (1983), Blue Öyster Cult (1984), Samantha Fox (1989), Jane's Addiction (1991), Pat Benatar (1991), Ramones (1991), Red Hot Chili Peppers and Pearl Jam (1991), Pixies (1991), Siouxsie and the Banshees (1992), Public Image Limited (1992), Sonic Youth (1992), "Weird Al" Yankovic (1992), Dream Theater (1993), Peter Frampton (1994), Lush and Weezer (1994), Scorpions (1994), and the venue's final concert, Roomful of Blues (1994).

The park was the inspiration for the title of Rocky Point Holiday, a 1966 composition for wind band by Ron Nelson.

Final years 
In the early 1990s, Rocky Point's financial situation became shaky. The privately held company that owned the park began to lose money in its attempts to leverage Rocky Point Park to fund other ventures. Rocky Point closed in 1994, then reopened briefly in 1996 as a farewell to patrons. Rides such as the Flume and Corkscrew were sold in an auction and are now in use at other amusement parks. The Corkscrew was sold for $850,000 to Wild Waves Theme Park in Federal Way, Washington, in 1997, where it was renamed the Wild Thing and remains in operation as of 2015.

Post-business era, vandalism 

After the Rocky Point land was purchased for $8.5 million in 2003, the park's main building, known as the "Big House", was hit by vandals who lit it on fire on September 2, 2004. Police said the fire was suspicious, because the building had no electricity at the time.

Another fire started on October 16, 2006, around 11 a.m., this time in an executive building on the waterfront. Police reported no injuries in either fire. It is unclear if this fire was caused by arson.

On May 7, 2007, demolition of the remaining midway officially began with a press conference at the park. Prior to this, a handful of stands and minor buildings had already been demolished.

On September 7, 2007, a documentary film about the park, You Must Be This Tall: The Story of Rocky Point Park, had its world premiere at the Stadium Theatre in Woonsocket, Rhode Island. The film garnered a five-star review from The Providence Journal and played to a sold-out crowd of 1,100 people.

In February 2008, the city of Warwick secured a federal grant to purchase about half of the  remaining Rocky Point Park, including much of the view of the bay. The city officially took title to  shoreline of the former park in August 2008.

On November 2, 2010, a ballot proposal passed to issue state funding to "acquire the title to land in and around what used to be Rocky Point Park to establish the land as a public park."

On September 17, 2012, the Small Business Administration accepted the state's offer to purchase the Rocky Point property to be developed into a state park.

On March 28, 2013, the sale of the remaining 82 acres of the former amusement park was conveyed to the state of Rhode Island.  The Rhode Island Department of Environmental Management (DEM) will oversee the operation and maintenance of the entire property.

On August 20, 2016, the film Tales of Rocky Point Park premiered at the Park Cinema in Cranston, Rhode Island.  The film chronicled real events and urban legend over the amusement park's long run.

Re-opening 

On June 26, 2011, Rocky Point was once again opened to the public and features a new asphalt mile long walking path along the shore of Narragansett Bay. The Shore Dinner Hall was later demolished while the rest of the amusement area was cleared and opened to the public. The majority of the amusement park space is now an empty field for the passive use park. A few elements of the park remain, including the upper and lower stations for the Skyliner gondola ride, ruins of an old water tank, and a large arch by the entrance that was originally built for the 1964 World's Fair in Flushing, Queens, and subsequently moved to Rocky Point.

, the State of Rhode Island is coordinating the development of Rocky Point State Park with the City of Warwick. Use by the public is being managed by the DEM Parks and Recreation office.

See also
 List of amusement parks in New England
 List of defunct amusement parks
 Amusement ride

References 

LaCross, George (7 October 2017). https://amusementparksandbeyond.wordpress.com/2017/10/07/rocky-point-parks-dark-corners/

External links 

Defunct amusement parks in the United States
Rhode Island culture
Amusement parks in Rhode Island
1847 establishments in Rhode Island
1995 disestablishments in Rhode Island
Amusement parks closed in 1995
Amusement parks opened in 1847
Companies that filed for Chapter 11 bankruptcy in 1996